Munkholm Bridge is a 114 metres long arch bridge across the Ise Fjord linking the Holbæk area (Holbæk Municipality) with the Hornsherred peninsula (Lejre Municipality). The bridge is located six kilometers from the bottom of the inlet. It was completed in 1951 and inaugurated in 1952.

See also
 List of bridges in Denmark

Bridges in Denmark
Arch bridges in Denmark
Road bridges in Denmark
Bridges completed in 1952
1952 establishments in Denmark
Buildings and structures in Holbæk Municipality